Vitalie Bulat (born 14 September 1987) is a Moldovan footballer.

Career
Born in Tiraspol, in the Moldovan SSR, Soviet Union, Vitalie Bulat started his senior career in the season 2003–04 by playing with FC Sheriff-2 Tiraspol in the Moldovan Second League.  He was FC Sheriff Tiraspol player from the start until the winter break of the 2011–12 season.  During his period there he had a number of loans, namely to other Moldovan top league sides FC Tiraspol and FC Iskra-Stal.  He played with Sheriff in the Moldovan National Division in the seasons 2004–05, 2005–06, 2008–09, 2009–10 and 2010–11.  During the winter break of the 2011–12 season he signed with FC Tiraspol where he would play the second half of the 2011–12 season, and the 2012–13.  In summer 2013 he moved abroad to Serbia and joined FK Novi Pazar. He made his debut in the 2013–14 Serbian SuperLiga as a substitute in an away match against FK Radnički 1923 on 30 November 2013. In 2014, he played on loan at FC Sunkar at 2014 Kazakhstan First Division.

National team
Vitalie Bulat was part of Moldovan U17, U19 and U21 national teams.

Honours
Sheriff
Moldovan National Division: 2004–05, 2005–06, 2008–09, 2009–10
Moldovan Cup: 2006, 2009, 2010
Moldovan Super Cup: 2005
CIS Cup: 2009

Tiraspol
Moldovan Cup: 2013

Iskra-Stal
Moldovan Cup: 2011

References

1987 births
Living people
People from Tiraspol
Moldovan footballers
Moldovan expatriate footballers
Association football midfielders
FC Sheriff Tiraspol players
FC Tiraspol players
FC Iskra-Stal players
FK Novi Pazar players
OFK Beograd players
Moldovan Super Liga players
Serbian SuperLiga players
Expatriate footballers in Serbia
FC Sunkar players
Expatriate footballers in Kazakhstan